Michael Almereyda (born April 7, 1960) is an American film director, screenwriter, and film producer.

Early work

Almereyda studied art history at Harvard but dropped out after three years to pursue filmmaking. He acquired a Hollywood agent on the strength of a spec script about Nikola Tesla. His first film as writer/director was a self-financed, black-and-white short featuring Dennis Hopper, A Hero of Our Time, based on Mikhail Lermontov's novel of the same title. Shot in 1985, it was finished in 1987 and screened in the 1992 Sundance Film Festival.
 
Early screenplays include Cherry 2000 (1987), the first draft for Wim Wenders’ Until the End of the World (1991), and uncredited work on Total Recall (1990).
 
Almereyda's films range across many genres, styles, and formats. His first feature, Twister (1989), based on Mary Robison’s novel Oh, was a comedy about a dysfunctional mid-Western family. Another Girl Another Planet (1992) was a romantic chamber piece, a black-and-white, one-hour featurette shot with a Fisher-Price Pixelvision camera. 

Nadja (1994) was a comic vampire film shot on 35mm with Pixelvision inserts. 

Hamlet (2000) was shot on Super 16mm and featured Ethan Hawke, Bill Murray, Kyle MacLachlan, Julia Stiles, Liev Schreiber and Sam Shepard. The adaptation layered a contemporary New York setting on Shakespeare's text.

2000s
Almereyda directed features set in pre- and post-Katrina New Orleans: Happy Here and Now (2002) and New Orleans, Mon Amour (2008). In 2004, he directed an episode of the HBO series Deadwood, His most recent work has mainly involved documentaries and shorts.

William Eggleston in the Real World (2005) was nominated for a Gotham Award for Best Documentary from the Independent Filmmaker Project, as was the sketchbook film Paradise (2009). 

He has recently returned to fiction film with a 2013 adaptation of Shakespeare’s Cymbeline, a spiritual successor to his earlier Hamlet. Experimenter (2015), was based on the life of Stanley Milgram, premiered at the Sundance Film Festival, and received critical acclaim. Marjorie Prime (2017), a philosophical science-fiction film based on Jordan Harrison's play of the same name, again screened at Sundance and won the Sloan Feature Film Prize. Most recently, he has directed a documentary on Hampton Fancher and adapted his Tesla spec script into  a 2020 film of the same name. 
 
Almereyda edited and contributed texts for Night Wraps the Sky: Writings by and About Mayakovsky, published by Farrar, Straus and Giroux in 2008, and William Eggleston: For Now, published by Twin Palms in 2010. 
 
He has written criticism and commentary for The New York Times, Film Comment, Artforum, Bookforum, The Believer, and Triple Canopy.

In 2015 Almereyda received the Moving Image Creative Capital Award.

Almereyda frequently uses the same actors. He has worked more than once with Suzy Amis, Karl Geary, Jared Harris, Ethan Hawke, Kyle MacLachlan, Isabelle Gillies, John Leguizamo, Lois Smith, Hannah Gross, and Jim Gaffigan.

Partial filmography

 A Hero of Our Time (1985)
 Twister (1989)
 Another Girl Another Planet (1992)
 Nadja (1994)
 At Sundance (1995)
 The Rocking Horse Winner (1997)
 The Eternal (1998)
 Hamlet (2000)
 Happy Here and Now (2002)
 This So-Called Disaster (2004)
 William Eggleston in the Real World (2005)
 New Orleans, Mon Amour (2008)
 Big River Blues (2008)

 Tonight at Noon (2009)
 Paradise (2009)
 The Great Gatsby in Five Minutes (2011)
 The Ogre's Feathers (2012)
 Skinningrove (2013)
 Cymbeline (2014)
 Experimenter (2015)
 Marjorie Prime (2017)
 Escapes (2017)
 Tesla (2020)

References

External links
 
 Fleeting Joy A website devoted to Almereyda's work.
 Michael Almereyda by Jeremiah Kipp, Senses of Cinema website
 King of Infinite Space, Filmmaker Magazine, Winter 1999

American film directors
American male screenwriters
Harvard College alumni
1959 births
Living people
English-language film directors
Alfred P. Sloan Prize winners